Tomohisa Ōtani (大谷 智久, born February 14, 1985, in Hyōgo Prefecture) is a Japanese former professional baseball pitcher who is currently a coach for the Chiba Lotte Marines of Nippon Professional Baseball (NPB). He has played in his entire career with the NPB for the Marines.

Career

On April 23, 2010, Otani made his NPB debut.

On December 2, 2020, Otani become a free agent.
On December 14, 2020, he announced his retirement and become coach for the Marines.

References

External links

NPB

1985 births
Living people
Baseball people from Hyōgo Prefecture
Chiba Lotte Marines players
Japanese baseball players
Waseda University alumni